Kuju Entertainment Ltd. is a British video game developer. The original company was Simis, formed in 1989 and purchased by Eidos Interactive in 1995. Kuju was formed in 1998 in Shalford, Surrey, England, after a management buyout of Simis from Eidos.

Kuju has released titles across different devices, ranging from Art Academy on the Nintendo DS, The Lord of the Rings: Aragorn's Quest and Battalion Wars 2 for the Wii, and an Xbox One title, Powerstar Golf,

History
Ian Baverstock and Jonathan Newth opened Simis in 1989 and produced a number of flight simulator programs like MiG-29 Fulcrum (1990 video game). In 1995, the company was purchased by Eidos and operated as an in-house development studio. In 1998, Baverstock and Newth led a management buyout of the studio from Eidos Interactive, forming Kuju Ltd.

The name "Kuju" originates from the initials of the founders’ first names: Ian Baverstock and Jonathan Newth. Jonathan was leafing through a Japanese dictionary when he found the numbers nine and ten – "ku" and "ju" – corresponding to the positions of "I" and "J" in the English alphabet. The combined result was Kuju. Their first game was Tank Racer, a 3D action racer for PC, PlayStation and mobile.

By 2001, Kuju was employing a team of 80 developers, in three separate offices around the UK in London, Surrey and Brighton. Their most notable project at the time was Microsoft Train Simulator. In 2002, Kuju floated on the Alternative Investments Market (AIM) of the London Stock Exchange. Shortly thereafter the company signed its first game with THQ based on the Games Workshop franchise, Warhammer 40,000: Fire Warrior. In the following years between 2002 and 2007, Kuju developed titles including SingStar games and the Battalion Wars franchise.

In 2007, Kuju Ltd. was acquired by a German media investment firm, Catalis SE. Soon after, Kuju Brighton was rebranded to Zoë Mode, and in 2008, Kuju London rebranded to Headstrong Games. In 2010, Headstrong Games completed development of Art Academy for the Nintendo DS console. In June 2012, Dominic Wheatley, co-founder of Domark, was appointed as CEO; while Gary Bracey, former vice-president of development at Ocean Software, was appointed as commercial director.

Studios

Kuju at one point had two UK studios: Headstrong Games in London and Zoë Mode in Brighton. Both have since been amalgamated back into Kuju.

Headstrong Games has developed versions of The House of the Dead: Overkill, The Lord of the Rings: Aragorn's Quest and Top Gun: Hard Lock. Original intellectual property include Art Academy and Battalion Wars, both now owned by Nintendo.

Zoë Mode have worked on the EyeToy series, Zumba dance franchise and Powerstar Golf. They also developed games for Xbox's Kinect.

Previous Kuju Studios
 Simis
 Kuju Surrey
 Kuju Sheffield (latterly rebranded as Chemistry)
 Nik Nak Games
 Kuju America
 Kuju Manila
 Vatra Games

Games

 Microsoft Train Simulator (2001)
 Lotus Challenge (2001)
 Reign of Fire (2002)
 Fire Blade (2002)
 SingStar (with London Studio) (2002)
 Warhammer 40,000: Fire Warrior (2003)
 EyeToy: Play (2003)
 GT-R 400 (2004)
 Crash Twinsanity 3D (2004)
 Call of Duty: Finest Hour (with Spark Unlimited) (PS2 and Xbox versions only) (2004)
 Battalion Wars (2005)
 The Regiment (2006)
 Sensible Soccer 2006 (2006)
 Pilot Academy (2006)
 Crush (2007)
 Geometry Wars: Galaxies (with Bizarre Creations) (2007)
 Battalion Wars 2 (2007)
 Nucleus (2007)
 Dancing with the Stars (2007)
 M.A.C.H. Modified Air Combat Heroes (2007)
 Sensible World of Soccer (Xbox Live Arcade version) (2007)
 Rock Revolution (2008-2009)
 You're in the Movies (2008-2009)
 The House of the Dead: Overkill (2009)
 Disney Sing It (2008)
 Rail Simulator (2007) (later renamed Railworks in 2009)
 Art Academy (2009–2010)
 The Lord of the Rings: Aragorn's Quest (2010)
 Chime (2010)
 Disney Sing It: Family Hits (2010)
 Grease: The Game (2010)
 Chime: Super Deluxe (2011)
 Zumba Fitness 2 (2011)
 Rush 'N Attack: Ex-Patriot (2011)
 Silent Hill: Downpour (2012)
 Top Gun: Hard Lock (2012)
 Haunt (2012)
 Crush 3D (2012)
 New Art Academy (2012)
 Zumba Fitness Rush (2012)
 Zumba Fitness Core (2012)
 Rabbids Rumble (2012)
 Zumba Fitness: World Party (2013)
 Zumba Kids (2013)
 Powerstar Golf (2013)
 Pokémon Art Academy (2014)
 Guitar Hero Live (2015)
 Disney Art Academy (2016)
 Marvel: Ultimate Alliance (2016)
 Marvel: Ultimate Alliance 2 (2016)
 Narcos: Rise of the Cartels'' (2019)

References

External links
 Catalis Group, parent company

British companies established in 1998
Video game companies established in 1998
Mobile game companies
Video game companies of the United Kingdom
Video game development companies
Companies based in London
1998 establishments in England
Companies formed by management buyout
2007 mergers and acquisitions